Tully railway station is located on the North Coast line in Queensland, Australia. It serves the town of Tully. The station has one platform. Opposite the platform lies a passing loop.

The station suffered severe water damage due to Cyclone Yasi in February 2011, and was subsequently refurbished. The old station building is still attached to the south side of the station, with visible damage.

Services
Tully is served by Traveltrain's Spirit of Queensland service.

References

External links

Tully station Queensland's Railways on the Internet

North Queensland
Regional railway stations in Queensland
North Coast railway line, Queensland
Tully, Queensland
Buildings and structures in Far North Queensland